|}

The Windsor Castle Stakes is a Listed flat horse race in Great Britain open to two-year-old horses. It is run over a distance of 5 furlongs (1,003 metres) at Ascot as part of the Royal Ascot meeting in June. It is currently run on the final day of the five-day meeting.

Winners since 1988

See also
Horse racing in Great Britain
List of British flat horse races

References
 Paris-Turf:
, 
Racing Post:

Flat races in Great Britain
Ascot Racecourse
Flat horse races for two-year-olds